Pershinskaya is a rural locality (a village) in Muravyovskoye Rural Settlement of Velsky District, Arkhangelsk Oblast, Russia. The population was 14 as of 2014.

Geography 
It is located on the Bolshaya Churga River, 17 km from Voronovskaya.

References 

Rural localities in Velsky District